Peachum may refer to:
"Peachum wood" referenced in Seixas v. Woods
Two characters in drama:
John Gay's The Beggar's Opera (1728)
Bertolt Brecht and Kurt Weill's The Threepenny Opera (1928)